Hawthorne School of Aeronautics was a flying school and airport located 5 miles south of Orangeburg, South Carolina.  The school was closed in 1945.  Today the land is being used for non-aviation purposes.

History 
The Hawthorne School of Aeronautics was a World War II civilian flying school, contracted by the United States Army Air Forces to conduct primary pilot training for aviation cadets.   The school was under the supervision of the 58th Flying Training Detachment, Eastern Flight Training Center, Army Air Forces Training Command. The president of Hawthorne was Beverly "Bevo" Howard, who had learned to fly at the age of 16. The military designation of the Hawthorne school was the 2162nd Army Air Force Base Unit.

In order to conduct the flying training, the school built an airfield along with buildings and other support structures.  The airfield was an all-way turf field, with four delineated runways (00/18; 05/23; 09/27; 14/32).  A large aircraft parking ramp and two hangars was also constructed along with a control tower and operations building.   The school structures consisted of a group of one and two-storied wooden buildings surrounding an oval-shaped grass area at the northern end of the property which served as a parade ground.

The primary trainer used  was Boeing PT-17 Stearman.  The flight school also operated several auxiliary airfields:
 Jennings Aux Field - Aux No. 1 Orangeburg 
 Hagood Aux Field -  Aux No. 2  Orangeburg 
 Kennedy Aux Field - Aux No. 3  Orangeburg 

At the end of 1944, training of Free French pilots was transferred from Hargrove Van de Graaft Airport, Tuscaloosa, Alabama to Hawthorne. The unit was inactivated on 1 September 1945.  During the Second World War, Hawthorne trained 5,924 military pilots, including more than 2,000 French Air Force students. For his leadership, Bevo Howard was presented the French Air Force Wings, the coveted French Médaille de L'Aéronautique, and later the Ordre National de la Légion d'honneur for his pilot training and accomplishments as an aerobatic flyer.

The Hawthorne School of Aeronautics ceased operations at Orangeburg with the end of the war, however it went on to continue operations at Jacksonville, Florida, and Moultrie, Georgia. The firm eventually became the large Piedmont-Hawthorne chain of aviation Fixed-Base Operators.

The airport was closed after the war, and was abandoned.  The two hangars from the flying school were relocated at some point to the Orangeburg Municipal Airport at which there is also an excellent historical display of the activities of the Hawthorne school.

See also

 South Carolina World War II Army Airfields

References 

 Manning, Thomas A. (2005), History of Air Education and Training Command, 1942–2002. Office of History and Research, Headquarters, AETC, Randolph AFB, Texas. 
 Shaw, Frederick J. (2004), Locating Air Force Base Sites, History’s Legacy, Air Force History and Museums Program, United States Air Force, Washington DC. 
  Free French flight training at Hawthorne
 Abandoned Airfields: Hawthorne School of Aeronautics
 World War II airfields database: South Carolina

USAAF Contract Flying School Airfields
Airfields of the United States Army Air Forces in South Carolina
Airports in South Carolina